The Nisqually Mission was a branch of the Methodist Mission, the only one established north of the Columbia River, outside Fort Nisqually in modern DuPont, Washington, United States. The station was actively used for two years, from 1840 to 1842, until its missionary John P. Richmond returned to the United States of America.

Creation
Prior to leaving for the United States in 1838, Jason Lee instructed temporary superintendent Leslie and blacksmith Wilson to establish a house at the location. An arrival aboard the Lausanne, John Richmond, was appointed as the missionary of the post.

Operations
The staff of the mission included Wilson and a teacher, Chloe Clark, who married while there. The diet of the families included oysters and clams which were given to them from the Nisqually people. Support for the station also came from John McLoughlin, who ordered donations of peas and flour along with the loaning of milk cows.

Richmond attended the celebration of the Fourth of July at American Lake held by the visiting United States Exploring Expedition in 1841. In an oration heard by the commanding officer Charles Wilkes, sailors, along with indigenous such as Duwamish chief Slugamus, Richmond stated that "The time will come... when these hills and valleys will have become peopled by our free and enterprising countrymen..."

Closure
Richmond began to lose interest in proselytizing by 1841, finding the Native populations "fast sinking into the grave. Extinction seems to be their inevitable doom..." After a year and a half of residency on the Puget Sound he departed with his family back to the United States. After the Nisqually station was abandoned François Blanchet reported that "His house was a little palace. I am told that a short time after his departure the natives set it on fire."

Citations

Bibliography

 
 
 
 
 

History of Christianity in the United States
Methodist Mission in Oregon
Oregon Country